A shield is a hand-held protective device meant to intercept attacks.

Shield may also refer to:

Forms of protection

From attack
 Human shield, the use of civilians to deter an attack in warfare
 Riot shield, used by police forces around the world for crowd control purposes

From radiation
 Cold shield, used to protect an object from radiative heating
 Electromagnetic shielding, the use of conductive material to block electromagnetic fields
 Lead shielding, the use of lead as a form of radiation protection
 Radiation shield, protection against ionizing radiation
 Shielded cable, electrical conductors enclosed by a conductive layer

Other forms of protection
 Dalkon Shield, a contraceptive intrauterine device (IUD)
 Gravitational shield, a hypothetical process of shielding an object from the influence of a gravitational field
 Heat shield, which protects a spacecraft or ballistic missile
 Tunnelling shield, used in excavation through soft soil
 Shielding, or cocooning, action taken by those who are clinically extremely vulnerable in relation to the COVID-19 pandemic

Currency
 Écu ("shield" in French), unit of currency, historically used in France
 Escudo ("shield" in Portuguese and Spanish), unit of currency, historically used in Portugal, Spain, and their former colonies, and still used in Cape Verde to this day
 Scudo (disambiguation) ("shield" in Italian), a unit of currency, historically used in Bolivia, several former Italian states, and Malta
 Shield nickel, the first United States five cent piece to be made out of copper-nickel

Geography and geology
 Shield (geology), a large area of exposed rocks that is tectonically stable
 Shield Nunatak, a prominent nunatak in Antarctica
 Shield volcano, a type of volcano usually built almost entirely of fluid lava flows

Arts, entertainment, and media

Fictional entities
 Shield (Archie Comics), one of several fictional patriotic superheroes
 Shield (Artemis Fowl), in the Artemis Fowl novel series, a magical ability possessed by fairies
 S.H.I.E.L.D., a fictional agency in the Marvel comics universe, led by Nick Fury
 Scyld Scefing (or Shield Sheafson), a legendary Danish king in the epic poem Beowulf

Games
 Pokémon Shield, one of the two paired Pokémon Sword and Shield games for the Nintendo Switch
 The Shield (video game), based on the television series

Television
 Agents of S.H.I.E.L.D., a television series based on the Marvel comics
 The Shield, a television police drama

Other uses in arts, entertainment, and media
 Aspis (Menander), translated as The Shield, a comedy play by Menander
 "Shield" (song), a song by Deep Purple on the album The Book of Taliesyn
 Shield (1963), a science-fiction novel by Poul Anderson
 Shield of Heracles, an archaic Greek epic poem attributed to Hesiod, concerning the expedition of Heracles and Iolaus against Cycnus

Sports
 Baskerville Shield, a trophy awarded to the winner of rugby league test series between Great Britain and New Zealand
 County Antrim Shield, a Northern Irish football competition
 County Championship Shield, formed in 2008 and originally played for by second tier teams in the RFU County Championship
 FA Community Shield, an English football trophy
 IFA Shield, an annual football competition organized by the Indian Football Association
 Indonesian Community Shield, a pre-season football competition held the week before the season begins in Indonesia every year
 Istanbul Shield, a Turkish football tournament which organised between 1930 and 1939
 J. J. Giltinan Shield, an Australian rugby league football trophy
 Johan Cruyff Shield, a football trophy in the Netherlands named after legendary Dutch football player Johan Cruyff, also often referred to as the Dutch Super Cup
 League Leaders' Shield, a trophy awarded to the team finishing the season top of Super League in the sport of rugby league football
 Sheffield Shield, a perpetual shield awarded to the Australian state cricket team that wins the final
 Supporters' Shield, an annual award given to the Major League Soccer team with the best regular season record, as determined by the MLS points system
 Thacker Shield, a rugby league football trophy awarded to the winner of a match between the champion clubs of the Canterbury Rugby League and West Coast Rugby League
 The Shield (professional wrestling), a professional wrestling stable in WWE

Technology and transportation
 Bumper (car), known as shield in British English
 Shield, name for expansion boards for Arduino microcontroller kits
 The Nvidia range of Android-based gaming products, including:
Nvidia Shield TV
Shield Portable
Shield Tablet

Other uses
 Shield (heraldry), the principal portion of a coat of arms
 Shield (surname)
 Highway shield, the United States uses shield-shaped signs for route markers, signs displaying the name and/or number of the road along which it is placed
 Shielding effect, in chemistry, reduced attraction of electrons to an atomic nucleus
 Scutum (constellation) (Latin for "Shield"), a small constellation near the celestial equator

See also
 Shields (disambiguation)